Duffields is an unincorporated community in Jefferson County, West Virginia, United States. Duffields depot is the second oldest surviving B&O depot, named for the pre-Civil War landowner who constructed it (Richard Duffield), and has been on the National Register of Historic Places since 2007. No longer in railroad use, it is expected to become a museum. During the American Civil War, a Confederate infantry company (Company H of the 2nd Virginia Infantry) was recruited from the area. The depot became a strategic target, most famous for its capture by Confederate Capt. John S. Mosby on June 29, 1864, as well as a raid his Rangers made on a Union army pay train on October 14, 1864 (the "Greenback raid"). The modern community is served by the Duffields MARC Train station, located on the Brunswick Line. Services to Washington, D.C. and Martinsburg are provided on weekdays.

References

Unincorporated communities in Jefferson County, West Virginia
Unincorporated communities in West Virginia